Tachystola hemisema is a moth of the family Oecophoridae. It is native to Australia, but is an invasive species in New Zealand and the United States, probably imported with Australian plants.

References

 

Oecophoridae
Moths described in 1885
Moths of Australia
Moths of New Zealand
Taxa named by Edward Meyrick